Events from the year 1895 in Sweden

Incumbents
 Monarch – Oscar II
 Prime Minister – Erik Gustaf Boström.

Events

 ÅF
 Bollnäs GIF
 Cederroth
 Idrottsföreningen Kamraterna
 IFK Askersund
 IFK Stockholm
 Stockholms KK
 IFK Sundsvall
 Swedish Sailing Federation
 IFK Uppsala Fotboll

Births

 9 January – Greta Johansson, diver (died 1978).
 12 September – Yngve Holm, sailor (died 1943).
 18 December – Ture Hedman, gymnast (died 1950).

Deaths

 30 January - Hilda Petrini, watchmaker  (born 1838)
 25 March - Bertha Valerius, photographer (born 1824)
 31 December – Augusta Dorothea Eklund, street peddler and  eccentric (born 1826) 
 Angelique Magito, actress  (born 1809)

References

 
Sweden
Years of the 19th century in Sweden